February 29 is a leap day or "leap year day", an intercalary date added periodically to leap years in the Julian and Gregorian calendars.  It is the 60th day of a leap year in both calendars, and 306 days remain until the end of the leap year. It is also the last day of February on leap years. It is also the last day of meteorological winter in Northern Hemisphere and the last day of meteorological summer in the Southern Hemisphere on leap years.

In the Gregorian calendar (the standard civil calendar used in most of the world), February 29 is added in each year that is an integer multiple of four (except for years evenly divisible by 100, but not by 400). The Julian calendar —since 1923, a liturgical calendar — has a February 29 every fourth year without exception. (Consequently, February 29 in the Julian calendar falls 13 days later than February 29 in the Gregorian, until the year 2100.)

Events

Pre-1600
1504 – Christopher Columbus uses his knowledge of a lunar eclipse that night to convince Jamaican natives to provide him with supplies.

1601–1900
1644 – Abel Tasman's second Pacific voyage begins as he leaves Batavia in command of three ships.
1704 – In Queen Anne's War, French forces and Native Americans stage a raid on Deerfield, Massachusetts Bay Colony, killing 56 villagers and taking more than 100 captive.
1712 – February 29 is followed by February 30 in Sweden, in a move to abolish the Swedish calendar for a return to the Julian calendar.
1720 – Ulrika Eleonora, Queen of Sweden abdicates in favour of her husband, who becomes King Frederick I on March 24.
1768 – Polish nobles form the Bar Confederation.
1796 – The Jay Treaty between the United States and Great Britain comes into force, facilitating ten years of peaceful trade between the two nations.
1892 – St. Petersburg, Florida is incorporated.

1901–present
1912 – The Piedra Movediza (Moving Stone) of Tandil falls and breaks.
1916 – Tokelau is annexed by the United Kingdom.
  1916   – In South Carolina, the minimum working age for factory, mill, and mine workers is raised from 12 to 14 years old.
1920 – The Czechoslovak National Assembly adopts the Constitution.
1936 – The February 26 Incident in Tokyo ends.
1940 – For her performance as Mammy in Gone with the Wind, Hattie McDaniel becomes the first African American to win an Academy Award.
  1940   – Finland initiates Winter War peace negotiations.
  1940   – In a ceremony held in Berkeley, California, physicist Ernest Lawrence receives the 1939 Nobel Prize in Physics from Sweden's consul general in San Francisco.
1944 – The Admiralty Islands are invaded in Operation Brewer, led by American general Douglas MacArthur, in World War II.
1960 – The 5.7  Agadir earthquake shakes coastal Morocco with a maximum perceived intensity of X (Extreme), destroying Agadir and leaving 12,000 dead and another 12,000 injured.
1972 – South Korea withdraws 11,000 of its 48,000 troops from Vietnam as part of Nixon's Vietnamization policy in the Vietnam War.
1980 – Gordie Howe of the Hartford Whalers makes NHL history as he scores his 800th goal.
1984 – Pierre Trudeau announces his retirement as Liberal Party leader and Prime Minister of Canada.
1988 – South African archbishop Desmond Tutu is arrested along with 100 other clergymen during a five-day anti-apartheid demonstration in Cape Town.
  1988   – Svend Robinson becomes the first member of the House of Commons of Canada to come out as gay.
1992 – First day of Bosnia and Herzegovina independence referendum.
1996 – Faucett Flight 251 crashes in the Andes; all 123 passengers and crew are killed.
  1996   – The Siege of Sarajevo officially ends.
2000 – Chechens attack a guard post near Ulus Kert, eventually killing 84 Russian paratroopers during the Second Chechen War.
2004 – Jean-Bertrand Aristide is removed as president of Haiti following a coup.
2008 – The United Kingdom's Ministry of Defence withdraws Prince Harry from a tour of Afghanistan after news of his deployment is leaked to foreign media.
  2008   – Misha Defonseca admits to fabricating her memoir, Misha: A Mémoire of the Holocaust Years, in which she claims to have lived with a pack of wolves in the woods during the Holocaust.
2012 – North Korea agrees to suspend uranium enrichment and nuclear and long-range missile tests in return for US food aid.
2016 – At least 40 people are killed and 58 others wounded following a suicide bombing by ISIL at a Shi'ite funeral in the city of Miqdadiyah, Diyala.
2020 – Joe Biden wins the South Carolina primary election.
  2020   – South Korea reports a record total of 3,150 confirmed cases of COVID-19 during the pandemic.
  2020   – During a demonstration, pro-government colectivos shoot at disputed President and Speaker of the National Assembly Juan Guaidó and his supporters in Barquisimeto, Venezuela, leaving five injured.
  2020   – The United States and the Taliban sign the Doha Agreement for bringing peace to Afghanistan.

Births

Pre-1600
1468 – Pope Paul III (d. 1549)
1528 – Albert V, Duke of Bavaria (d. 1579)
  1528   – Domingo Báñez, Spanish theologian (d. 1604)
1572 – Edward Cecil, 1st Viscount Wimbledon (d. 1638)
1576 – Antonio Neri, Florentine priest and glassmaker (d. 1614)

1601–1900
1640 – Benjamin Keach, Particular Baptist preacher and author whose name was given to Keach's Catechism (d. 1704)
1692 – John Byrom, English poet and educator (d. 1763)
1724 – Eva Marie Veigel, Austrian-English dancer (d. 1822)
1736 – Ann Lee, English-American religious leader, founded the Shakers (d. 1784)
1792 – Gioachino Rossini, Italian composer (d. 1868)
1812 – James Milne Wilson, Scottish-Australian soldier and politician, eighth Premier of Tasmania (d. February 29, 1880)
1828 – Emmeline B. Wells, American journalist, poet, and activist (d. 1921)
1836 – Dickey Pearce, American baseball player and manager (d. 1908)
1852 – Frank Gavan Duffy, Irish-Australian lawyer and judge, fourth Chief Justice of Australia (d. 1936)
1852 – Prince George Maximilianovich, 6th Duke of Leuchtenberg (d. 1912)
1860 – Herman Hollerith, American statistician and businessman, co-founded the Computing-Tabulating-Recording Company (d. 1929)
1884 – Richard S. Aldrich, American lawyer and politician (d. 1941)
1892 – Augusta Savage, American sculptor (d. 1962)
1896 – Morarji Desai, Indian civil servant and politician, fourth Prime Minister of India (d. 1995)
  1896   – William A. Wellman, American actor, director, producer, and screenwriter (d. 1975)

1901–present
1904 – Jimmy Dorsey, American saxophonist, composer, and bandleader (d. 1957)
  1904   – Pepper Martin, American baseball player and manager (d. 1965)
1908 – Balthus, French-Swiss painter and illustrator (d. 2001)
  1908   – Dee Brown, American historian and author (d. 2002)
  1908   – Alf Gover, English cricketer and coach (d. 2001)
  1908   – Louie Myfanwy Thomas, Welsh writer (d. 1968)
1916 – James B. Donovan, American lawyer (d. 1970)
 1916   – Leonard Shoen, founder of U-Haul Corp. (d. 1999)
1920 – Fyodor Abramov, Russian author and critic (d. 1983)
  1920   – Arthur Franz, American actor (d. 2006)
  1920   – James Mitchell, American actor and dancer (d. 2010)
  1920   – Michèle Morgan, French-American actress and singer (d. 2016)
  1920   – Rolland W. Redlin, American lawyer and politician (d. 2011)
1924 – David Beattie, New Zealand judge and politician, 14th Governor-General of New Zealand (d. 2001)
  1924   – Carlos Humberto Romero, Salvadoran politician, President of El Salvador (d. 2017)
  1924   – Al Rosen, American baseball player and manager (d. 2015)
1928 – Joss Ackland, English actor
  1928   – Jean Adamson, British writer and illustrator
  1928   – Vance Haynes, American archaeologist, geologist, and author
  1928   – Seymour Papert, South African mathematician and computer scientist, co-creator of the Logo programming language (d. 2016)
1932 – Gene H. Golub, American mathematician and academic (d. 2007)
  1932   – Masten Gregory, American race car driver (d. 1985)
  1932   – Reri Grist, American soprano and actress
  1932   – Jaguar, Brazilian cartoonist
  1932   – Gavin Stevens, Australian cricketer
1936 – Nh. Dini, Indonesian writer (d. 2018)
  1936   – Jack R. Lousma, American colonel, astronaut, and politician
  1936   – Henri Richard, Canadian ice hockey player (d. 2020)
  1936   – Alex Rocco, American actor (d. 2015)
1940 – Sonja Barend, Dutch talk show host
1944 – Dennis Farina, American police officer and actor (d. 2013)
  1944   – Nicholas Frayling, English priest and academic
  1944   – Phyllis Frelich, American actress (d. 2014)
  1944   – Steve Mingori, American baseball player (d. 2008)
  1944   – Paolo Eleuteri Serpieri, Italian author and illustrator
  1944   – Lennart Svedberg, Swedish ice hockey player (d. 1972).
1948 – Hermione Lee, English author, critic, and academic
  1948   – Manoel Maria, Brazilian footballer
  1948   – Patricia A. McKillip, American author
1952 – Tim Powers, American author and educator
  1952   – Raisa Smetanina, Russian cross-country skier
  1952   – Bart Stupak, American police officer and politician
1956 – Jonathan Coleman, English-Australian radio and television host (d. 2021)
  1956   – Bob Speller, Canadian businessman and politician, 30th Canadian Minister of Agriculture
  1956   – Aileen Wuornos, American serial killer (d. 2002)
  1960 – Khaled, Algerian singer-songwriter
  1960   – Richard Ramirez, American serial killer (d. 2013)
1964 – Dave Brailsford, English cyclist and coach
  1964   – Lyndon Byers, Canadian ice hockey player and radio host
  1964   – Mervyn Warren, American tenor, composer, and producer
1968 – Chucky Brown, American basketball player and coach
  1968   – Gareth Farr, New Zealand composer and percussionist
  1968   – Pete Fenson, American curler
  1968   – Bryce Paup, American football player and coach
  1968   – Howard Tayler, American author and illustrator
  1968   – Eugene Volokh, Ukrainian-American lawyer and educator
  1968   – Frank Woodley, Australian actor, producer, and screenwriter
1972 – Sylvie Lubamba, Italian showgirl
  1972   – Mike Pollitt, English footballer and coach
  1972   – Antonio Sabàto Jr., Italian-American model and actor
  1972   – Pedro Sánchez, Prime Minister of Spain
  1972   – Dave Williams, American singer (d. 2002)
  1972   – Saul Williams, American singer-songwriter
  1972   – Pedro Zamora, Cuban-American activist and educator (d. 1994)
1976 – Vonteego Cummings, American basketball player
  1976   – Katalin Kovács, Hungarian sprint kayaker
  1976   – Terrence Long, American baseball player
  1976   – Ja Rule, American rapper and actor
1980 – Çağdaş Atan, Turkish footballer and coach
  1980   – Simon Gagné, Canadian ice hockey player
  1980   – Rubén Plaza, Spanish cyclist
  1980   – Clinton Toopi, New Zealand rugby league player
  1980   – Taylor Twellman, American soccer player and sportscaster
  1980   – Peter Scanavino, American actor, who is well-known for his role on Law & Order: Special Victims Unit
1984 – Darren Ambrose, English footballer
  1984   – Rica Imai, Japanese model and actress
  1984   – Cullen Jones, American swimmer
  1984   – Nuria Martínez, Spanish basketball player
  1984   – Lena Raine, American video game composer and producer
  1984   – Rakhee Thakrar, English actress
  1984   – Cam Ward, Canadian ice hockey player
  1984   – Mark Foster, American singer, songwriter and musician
1988 – Lena Gercke, German model and television host
  1988   – Benedikt Höwedes, German footballer
  1988   – Brent Macaffer, Australian Rules footballer
  1988   – Hannah Mills, Welsh sports sailor
1992 – Sean Abbott, Australian cricketer
  1992   – Eric Kendricks, American football player
  1992   – Jessica Long, American paralympic swimmer
  1992   – Jessie T. Usher, American actor
1996 – Nelson Asofa-Solomona, New Zealand rugby league player
  1996   – Reece Prescod, British sprinter
  1996   – Claudia Williams, New Zealand tennis player
2000 – Tyrese Haliburton, American basketball player
  2000   – Ferran Torres, Spanish footballer
2004 – Lydia Jacoby, American swimmer

Deaths

Pre-1600
 468 – Pope Hilarius
 992 – Oswald of Worcester, Anglo-Saxon archbishop and saint (b. 925)
1460 – Albert III, Duke of Bavaria-Munich (b. 1401)
1528 – Patrick Hamilton, Scottish Protestant reformer and martyr (b. 1504)
1592 – Alessandro Striggio, Italian composer and diplomat (b. 1536/1537)
1600 – Caspar Hennenberger, German pastor, historian and cartographer (b. 1529)

1601–1900
1604 – John Whitgift, English archbishop and academic (b. 1530)
1712 – Johann Conrad Peyer, Swiss anatomist (b. 1653)
1744 – John Theophilus Desaguliers, French-English physicist and philosopher (b. 1683)
1792 – Johann Andreas Stein, German piano builder (b. 1728)
1820 – Johann Joachim Eschenburg, German historian and critic (b. 1743)
1848 – Louis-François Lejeune, French general, painter and lithographer (b. 1775)
1856 – Auguste Chapdelaine, French Christian missionary (b. 1814)
1868 – Ludwig I of Bavaria (b. 1786)
1880 – James Milne Wilson, Scottish-Australian soldier and politician, 8th Premier of Tasmania (b. February 29, 1812)

1901–present
1904 – Patrick O'Sullivan, Irish-Australian politician (b. 1818)
  1904   – Henri Joseph Anastase Perrotin, French astronomer (b. 1845)
1908 – Pat Garrett, American sheriff (b. 1850)
  1908   – John Hope, 1st Marquess of Linlithgow, Scottish-Australian politician, 1st  Governor-General of Australia (b. 1860)
1916 – John Nanson, English-Australian journalist and politician (b. 1863)
1920 – Ernie Courtney, American baseball player (b. 1875)
1924 – Frederic Chapple, Australian educator (b. 1845)
1928 – Adolphe Appia, Swiss architect and theorist (b. 1862)
  1928   – Ina Coolbrith, American poet and librarian (b. 1841)
1932 – Arthur Mills Lea, Australian entomologist (b. 1868)
  1932   – Giuseppe Vitali, Italian mathematician (b. 1875)
1940 – E. F. Benson, English archaeologist and author (b. 1867)
1944 – Pehr Evind Svinhufvud, Finnish lawyer, judge and politician, 3rd  President of Finland (b. 1861)
1948 – Robert Barrington-Ward, English lawyer and journalist (b. 1891)
1952 – Sarah Ann Jenyns, Australian entrepreneur (b. 1865)
1956 – Elpidio Quirino, Filipino lawyer and politician, 6th  President of the Philippines (b. 1890)
1960 – Melvin Purvis, American police officer and  FBI agent (b. 1903)
  1960   – Walter Yust, American journalist and author (b. 1894)
1964 – Frank Albertson, American actor and singer (b. 1909)
1968 – Tore Ørjasæter, Norwegian poet and educator (b. 1886)
1972 – Tom Davies, American football player and coach (b. 1896)
1976 – Florence P. Dwyer, American politician (b. 1902)
1980 – Yigal Allon, Israeli general and politician,  Prime Minister of Israel (b. 1918)
  1980   – Gil Elvgren, American painter and illustrator (b. 1914)
1984 – Ludwik Starski, Polish screenwriter and songwriter (b. 1903)
1992 – Ruth Pitter, English poet and author (b. 1897)
1996 – Frank Daniel, Czech-American director, producer, and screenwriter (b. 1926)
  1996   – Wes Farrell, American singer-songwriter and producer (b. 1939)
  1996   – Ralph Rowe, American baseball player, coach and manager (b. 1924)
2000 – Dennis Danell, American guitarist (b. 1961)
2004 – Kagamisato Kiyoji, Japanese sumo wrestler, the 42nd  Yokozuna (b. 1923)
  2004   – Jerome Lawrence, American playwright and author (b. 1915)
  2004   – Harold Bernard St. John, Barbadian lawyer and politician, 3rd  Prime Minister of Barbados (b. 1931)
  2004   – Lorrie Wilmot, South African cricketer (b. 1943)
2008 – Janet Kagan, American author (b. 1946)
  2008   – Erik Ortvad, Danish painter and illustrator (b. 1917)
  2008   – Akira Yamada, Japanese scholar and philosopher (b. 1922)
2012 – Davy Jones, English singer, guitarist and actor (b. 1945)
  2012   – Sheldon Moldoff, American illustrator (b. 1920)
  2012   – P. K. Narayana Panicker, Indian social leader (b. 1930)
2016 – Wenn V. Deramas, Filipino director and screenwriter (b. 1966)
  2016   – Gil Hill, American police officer, actor and politician (b. 1931)
  2016   – Josefin Nilsson, Swedish singer (b. 1969)
  2016   – Mumtaz Qadri, Pakistani assassin (b. 1985)
  2016   – Louise Rennison, English author (b. 1951)
2020 – Dieter Laser, German actor (b. 1942)
  2020   – Éva Székely, Hungarian Hall of Fame swimmer and 1952 Olympic champion (b. 1927)

Holidays and observances
 As a Christian feast day:
Saint John Cassian
February 29 in the Orthodox church
Rare Disease Day (in leap years; celebrated in common years on February 28)
Bachelor's Day (Ireland, United Kingdom)

References

External links

 BBC: On This Day
 
 Historical Events on February 29

Days of the year
February
Discordian holidays
Old Style leap years